The New Zealand Customs Service (Customs, Māori: Te Mana Ārai o Aotearoa) is a state sector organisation in New Zealand whose role is to provide border control and protect the community from potential risks arising from international trade and travel, as well as collecting duties and taxes on imports to the country.

New Zealand's current Minister of Customs is Meka Whaitiri.

History 
Customs is the oldest government department in New Zealand. Formed on 5 January 1840, it pre-dates the signing of the Treaty of Waitangi by one month. Its early establishment was necessary to collect revenue for the fledgling government, and over the years duties, tariffs and taxes collected by Customs have remained a major source of revenue for the country, although customs has also been used to impose various control over the movement of people and the distribution of particular products, in particular alcohol and tobacco.

In 1996, the New Zealand Customs Department was renamed the New Zealand Customs Service.

In recent years Customs has modernised itself in order to keep pace with new technologies and the ever-increasing volumes of international passengers and trade, while balancing its law enforcement and compliance obligations. Staffing levels sit between 1300 and 1500 nationally, with its head office located in Wellington. Staff are based at various ports and locations around New Zealand and are a mixture of frontline uniformed staff such as those seen at the airports and sea ports, as well as plainclothes staff in varying other roles.

Responsibilities 

Customs is a law enforcement agency in its own right, and is responsible for intercepting contraband, and checks international travelers and their baggage, as well as cargo and mail, for banned or prohibited items. Contrary to popular belief, it is not responsible for biosecurity items such as food and other agricultural items declared at ports of entry - this is the responsibility for the Ministry for Primary Industries. Customs is also responsible for assessing and collecting Customs duties, excise taxes and Goods and Services Tax on imports and protecting New Zealand businesses against illegal trade. It is second only to the Inland Revenue Department for the amount of revenue it collects for the New Zealand Government. It exercises controls over restricted and prohibited imports and exports, including objectionable material (such as child sex abuse images), drugs, firearms and hazardous waste and also collects import and export data.

Customs is responsible for documentation of all imports and exports (in 2006/7 this was 47 million imports and 33 million exports). Since 1999 all documentation to Customs has been electronic.

Customs works closely with New Zealand's other border agencies, the Ministry for Primary Industries, the Aviation Security Service (AvSec) and Immigration New Zealand. It also works very closely with the New Zealand Police and the Organised and Financial Crime Agency of New Zealand in joint operations involving the importation of drugs, and with the Department of Conservation on the management of items that are subject to CITES.

Customs established the Trade Single Window in 2013 to provide a single place to lodge import and export documents with all of New Zealand Government.

Whilst an unarmed agency, some Customs officers are authorised to carry handcuffs and make arrests in relation to offences relating to the importation of drugs and other prohibited goods.

Customs is also the administrative body of the New Zealand Government responsible for the domestic collection and control of excise tax on tobacco and alcohol.

Pseudoephedrine 
Customs officers continue to make significant seizures of pseudoephedrine, a precursor for Methamphetamine. Open source media and Customs reporting to government suggests that pseudoephedrine makes up the large majority of Customs seizures. These seizures have resulted in multiple arrests and successful prosecutions by Customs and Police officers.

In October 2010, then Comptroller of Customs Martyn Dunne advised a New Zealand Parliament committee that 796 kg of Pseudoephedrine, with a value of $90 million, had been seized in the nine months to 30 September, compared with 733 kg for the whole year in 2009. It was later revealed that Customs seized over a tonne of pseudoephedrine in 2010.

Office locations 
Customs officers are based at the main cities in New Zealand, as well as a number of smaller ports. Its headquarters is in Wellington, New Zealand's capital city. Customs also has liaison officers based at the following overseas locations: Bangkok, Beijing, Brussels, Canberra, Hong Kong, Jakarta, London, Los Angeles and Washington D.C.

Recruitment and training

Recruitment 
Customs conducts national intakes, with the number of intakes per year varying dependent on the needs of the Service. Typically each intake will consist of 20–30 recruits who are referred to as 'cohorts'. Recruiting usually begins with Customs advertising nationwide, calling for applications for persons who meet requisite criteria. Applications are then reviewed and accepted or rejected. The majority of applicants are culled at this initial stage. Persons who pass the initial application process are then invited to 'open days' at central locations (usually Auckland, Wellington and Christchurch) during which they are given insights into the various roles Customs undertakes as well as being placed into groups and are assessed during group problem solving scenarios, where individuals are observed by assessors and are judged on various factors such as interaction, initiative and leadership traits. Those who are deemed suitable must then pass an interview, police checks and medical test before being offered a space on the next intake.

Training 
Training consists of a 6-week, classroom based course. This is gives new cohorts extensive knowledge in Customs, covering Customs history, relevant legislation, questioning techniques, physical training, self-defense training, and presentations from various other work areas in Customs. During the course, multiple examinations are undertaken, and if passed, new cohorts will be awarded their "stripes" in the form of epaulettes.
Following the classroom course, there is on-the-job training for one year. At the conclusion of all training, cohorts will have a graduation ceremony where they will be awarded with a certificate confirming their graduation.

References

External links 

 
 Customs and Excise Act 2018

Customs services
Foreign trade of New Zealand
Specialist law enforcement agencies of New Zealand
New Zealand Public Service departments